Fritillaria anhuiensis is a Chinese species of bulb-forming flowering plant in the lily family Liliaceae. It is native to Anhui and Henan Provinces in China.

Fritillaria anhuiensis produces bulbs up to 20 mm in diameter. Stem is up to 50 cm long, supporting usually 1 or 2 flowers but occasionally 3 or 4. Flowers are nodding (hanging downwards), usually yellowish with purple spots but sometimes white or purple.

References

anhuiensis
Endemic flora of China
Plants described in 1983